The McLaren M28 is a Formula One racing car built and run by McLaren in the 1979 Formula One World Championship. Powered by a naturally-aspirated Ford Cosworth 3-litre engine, the M28 was designed and wind tunnel tested during the latter half of 1978, at around the same time as Ronnie Peterson was mooted to join the team for the following season. The car was noticeably larger than contemporary designs and was much bulkier looking. Three chassis were built. The bulky design had a sharp impact on top speed, and the car was one of the slowest through speed traps. The car first appeared on track in October 1978 during a test at Watkins Glen.

During initial testing, the M28 was soon found to have problems with poor grip as its ground effect design proved not particularly effective. Lead driver John Watson has described the car as "a disaster." Patrick Tambay was even less enthused by the M28, labelling it "a shitbox." The car suffered from a lack of torsional rigidity and a poor understanding of the ground effect aerodynamics required to be competitive against the new generation of F1 cars. 

Watson described how after the first round of tests had been done, the chassis was drooping and had lost all tensile strength. The team, unused to working with advanced aerodynamics tried conventional adjustments to compensate, to no avail. He later stated that the M28 was the worst F1 car that he ever drove.

Coppuck had designed the car to have a very narrow monocoque constructed of aluminium and nomex honeycomb to give the car a stiff chassis with as large an underfloor area as possible for the ground effect to work, but the upshot was that the car had a large frontal area which caused drag. McLaren boss Teddy Mayer was shocked at the car's lack of performance, stating that Coppuck had dropped the ball. 

The M28 was completely redesigned, and the B spec car was introduced in Belgium, but there was no improvement in performance. Efforts to resolve the car's problems had made the M28 overweight and slow. However, it was still the preferred chassis over its predecessor, the McLaren M26, and was used during the first half of the 1979 season until a better design could be introduced. As their rivals introduced better cars through the season McLaren rapidly slipped out of the running for the championship. However, it was driven to third in the opening race of the season, the 1979 Argentine Grand Prix, by Watson, who also took sixth in Belgium and fourth at Monaco. Its second driver was Patrick Tambay.

In addition to the McLaren team's customary red and white Marlboro sponsorship livery, the M28 also raced in the colours of German beer company Löwenbräu at the 1979 United States Grand Prix West.

Complete Formula One World Championship results
(key) (results in bold indicate pole position) (results in italics indicate fastest lap)

* 7 points scored using the McLaren M29.

References

McLaren Formula One cars
1979 Formula One season cars